Keithen McCant (born March 8, 1969) is a former American football quarterback who played three seasons in the Canadian Football League with the Winnipeg Blue Bombers and BC Lions. He was drafted by the Cleveland Browns in the twelfth round of the 1992 NFL Draft. He played college football at the University of Nebraska–Lincoln and attended Grand Prairie High School in Grand Prairie, Texas.

References

External links
Just Sports Stats
College stats

Living people
1969 births
Players of American football from Texas
Sportspeople from the Dallas–Fort Worth metroplex
American football quarterbacks
Canadian football quarterbacks
African-American players of American football
African-American players of Canadian football
Nebraska Cornhuskers football players
Winnipeg Blue Bombers players
BC Lions players
People from Grand Prairie, Texas
21st-century African-American people
20th-century African-American sportspeople